Cornock is a surname. Notable people with the surname include:

Don Cornock (born 1930), Scottish footballer
Matthew Cornock (1890–1961), Scottish footballer
Walter Cornock (1921–2007), Australian football goalkeeper and first-class cricketer

See also
Cornick